WXDM is a Catholic Religious formatted broadcast radio station licensed to Front Royal, Virginia, serving the Northern Shenandoah Valley.  WXDM is owned and operated by Christendom College.

Station launch
Bishop Paul S. Loverde of the Roman Catholic Diocese of Arlington blessed the transmitter and studios of WXDM on January 18, 2013.  With the Bishop's blessing, WXDM took to the airwaves as the first Catholic radio station in the Commonwealth of Virginia.

Simulcast
On July 22, 2013, WXDM began simulcasting Winchester-based WHFW.

References

External links
 Radio Christendom Online
 

Catholic radio stations
XDM
Christendom College
2013 establishments in Virginia
Radio stations established in 2013
College radio stations in Virginia